The Te Kopahou Reserve is a scenic, conservation and recreation reserve in Wellington in the North Island of New Zealand. It is located on the south coast of Wellington, and features rugged landscape including the sea coast adjoining Cook Strait, and the hill tops of Te Kopahou and Hawkins Hill.  The reserve extends from the suburb of Brooklyn to the south coast at Ōwhiro Bay, and westwards along the south coast to Red Rocks/Pariwhero and Sinclair Head/Rimurapa.

Features
The coastline and hilltops provide views across Cook Strait to the South Island. The reserve includes bush-clad gullies and exposed ridgelines, and has a variety of walking and mountain biking tracks. There is a  white radar dome (radome) that provides the primary radar and secondary surveillance radar for Wellington Airport and the wider Wellington region.

The peak Te Kopahou (485 metres) is to the south-west, along the ridgeline. Most of the land in the reserve is administered by the Wellington City Council.

Red Rocks/ Pariwhero 
There is a flat walking track along the beach from the Owhiro Bay entrance to Te Kopahou Reserve, past an old quarry and a small group of historic cottages from the early 1900s, and beyond the distinctive Red Rocks to Devil's Gate at Sinclair Head. This is the location of a colony of New Zealand fur seals.

Track development plan 
In 2020 and 2021, the Wellington City Council consulted with the community over a draft long-term plan for the development of tracks in Te Kopahou Reserve.

In popular culture
In 2021, the scenery of Te Kopahou Reserve was used as the main visual backdrop in a music video by the locally based artist Lake South, for his track Townbelt.

References

External links

 Te Kopahou Reserve brochure
 Music video featuring Te Kopahou scenery

Wellington City
Parks in Wellington City
Tourist attractions in Wellington City
Nature reserves in New Zealand